François Sermon (31 March 1923 – 17 March 2013) was a Belgian footballer who played as a midfielder for Anderlecht and the Belgium national team. He died on 17 March 2013, at the age of 89.

References

External links
 

1923 births
2013 deaths
Belgian footballers
Belgium international footballers
R.S.C. Anderlecht players
Association football midfielders